The Radio Detective is a 1926 American adventure film serial directed by William James Craft and William A. Crinley and released by Universal Pictures. The film is considered to be lost.

Cast
 Jack Dougherty as Easton Evans (as Jack Daugherty)
 Margaret Quimby as Ruth Evans
 Jack Mower as Craig Kennedy
 Wallace Baldwin as Hank Hawkins, Crook
 Howard Enstedt as Ken Adams, Policeman
 John T. Prince as Professor Ronald Varis
 Florence Allen as Rae Varis
 Sammy Gervon as Crook
 Buck Connors
 George Williams
 Monte Montague

List of episodes
Chapter 1: The Kick Off! 
Chapter 2: The Radio Riddle 
Chapter 3: The Radio Wizard 
Chapter 4: Boy Scout Loyalty 
Chapter 5: The Radio Secret 
Chapter 6: Fighting For Love 
Chapter 7: The Tenderfoot Scout 
Chapter 8: The Truth Teller 
Chapter 9: The Fire Fiend 
Chapter 10: Radio Romance

See also
 List of film serials
 List of film serials by studio

References

External links

1926 films
1926 adventure films
1926 lost films
American silent serial films
American black-and-white films
American adventure films
Films directed by William James Craft
Films with screenplays by Arthur B. Reeve
Lost adventure films
Lost American films
1920s American films
Silent adventure films